Neva Walker (born December 14, 1971) is an American politician who served in the Minnesota House of Representatives from district 61B from 2001 to 2009. Walker was the first African-American woman to be elected to the Minnesota Legislature.

References

1971 births
Living people
Politicians from Minneapolis
Women state legislators in Minnesota
African-American state legislators in Minnesota
Democratic Party members of the Minnesota House of Representatives
South High School (Minnesota) alumni
African-American women in politics
21st-century American politicians
21st-century African-American politicians
21st-century American women politicians